Shamsid-Deen is a surname. Notable people with the surname include:

Abdul Shamsid-Deen (born 1968), American basketball player
Hassan Shamsid-Deen (born 1976), American football player
Muhammad Shamsid-Deen (born 1969), American football player

Compound surnames
Surnames of Arabic origin